In Greek mythology, Ascalaphus (Ancient Greek: Ἀσκάλαφος Askalaphos) was the son of Acheron and Orphne.

Mythology 
Ascalaphus was the custodian of the orchard of Hades. He told the other gods that Persephone had eaten pomegranate seeds in the Underworld. Because she had tasted food in the underworld, Persephone was obliged to return to the Underworld and spend four months (in later versions six months) there every year.

Demeter was so angry, she buried Ascalaphus beneath a heavy rock in the Underworld. When Heracles went to the underworld, he rolled the stone away and released him from his prison. But then, Demeter transformed Ascalaphus into an eagle owl owl. According to another myth, Persephone herself changed him into an eagle owl by sprinkling him with water of the river Phlegethon. Ovid mentions: "So he became the vilest bird; a messenger of grief; the lazy owl; sad omen to mankind." As an owl, he became the familiar bird of Hades, god of the underworld.

See also 
 Ascalaphidae – the owlflies, named after Ascalaphus

Notes

References 
 Apollodorus, Apollodorus, The Library, with an English Translation by Sir James George Frazer, F.B.A., F.R.S. in 2 Volumes. Cambridge, Massachusetts, Harvard University Press; London, William Heinemann Ltd. 1921. . Online version at the Perseus Digital Library.
 Ovid, Metamorphoses, Brookes More, Boston, Cornhill Publishing Co. 1922. Online version at the Perseus Digital Library.

Children of Potamoi
Metamorphoses into birds in Greek mythology
Symbols of Hades
Greek underworld
Eleusinian Mysteries
Rape of Persephone
Fictional horticulturists and gardeners
Deeds of Demeter